Arthur Elvin Davies (7 May 1867 – 27 March 1918) was an Australian businessman and politician who was a member of the Legislative Assembly of Western Australia from 1906 to 1911, representing the seat of South Fremantle.

Davies was born in Fremantle to Hannah Elizabeth (née Williams) and Alfred Alexander Davies. Two of his older brothers, George Alfred and Edward William Davies, served as Mayor of Fremantle. Before entering politics himself, Davies was a cabinet maker and upholsterer who eventually set up as a furniture importer. In November 1889, he also established an undertaking firm. Davies was elected to the Fremantle Road Board (now the City of Cockburn) in 1894, and would serve as mayor from 1905 to 1911. He was elected to parliament at the 1906 South Fremantle by-election, which had been caused by the death of Arthur Diamond. He was re-elected at the 1908 state election, but chose not to contest the 1911 election. Davies died in Beaconsfield in March 1918, aged 50. He had married Margaret Jessie Kilpatrick in 1893, with whom he had three children.

See also
 List of mayors of Cockburn

References

1867 births
1918 deaths
Mayors of places in Western Australia
Members of the Western Australian Legislative Assembly
People from Fremantle
19th-century Australian businesspeople
Western Australian local councillors